Michel Jansen (born 3 March 1966, Vriezenveen) is Dutch football manager and former player for DETO Twenterand, Heracles Almelo, STEVO and Excelsior '31.

Jansen received the Rinus Michels Award in 2007 while coaching HHC Hardenberg.

He became manager of FC Twente during the season 2013 - 2014 because current manager Alfred Schreuder was not a qualified coach at that time. During the season 2014 - 2015 Michel Jansen was the assistant manager of Alfred Schreuder, then he became coach of Jong Twente. Starting 2018 he is the assistant coach of SC Heerenveen.

References

1966 births
Living people
Dutch football managers
FC Twente managers
Eredivisie managers
People from Vriezenveen
Rinus Michels Award winners
SC Heerenveen non-playing staff
DETO Twenterand players
Heracles Almelo players
FC Twente non-playing staff
Dutch footballers
RKVV STEVO players
Association footballers not categorized by position
Footballers from Overijssel